Corinth is a city in Denton County, Texas, United States; it is a part of the Dallas-Fort Worth metroplex. Its population was 22,634 at the 2020 census.

Geography

Corinth is located at  (33.143952, –97.072194).

Demographics

According to the 2020 United States census, there were 22,634 people, 7,208 households, and 5,965 families residing in the city. At the 2010 census, 19,935 people were living in the city. The population density was 2,523.4 people/sq mi (977.2/km). The 7,138 housing units had an average density of 903.5/sq mi (349.9/km).

In 2010, the racial makeup of the city was 84.7% White, 5.7% African American, 0.8% Native American, 2.7% Asian, 0.05% Pacific Islander, 3.2% some other race, and 2.9% from two or more races. Hispanics or Latinos of any race were 11.8%. By the 2020 census, its racial and ethnic makeup was 65.89% non-Hispanic white, 6.48% Black or African American, 0.49% Native American, 4.17% Asian, 0.05% Pacific Islander, 0.37% some other race, 5.86% multiracial, and 16.69% Hispanic or Latino of any race.

According to a 2007 estimate, the median household income was $95,967, and the median family income  was $96,375. Males had a median income of $52,362 versus $35,089 for females. The per capita income for the city was $30,492. About 1.0% of families and 1.6% of the population were below the poverty line, including 1.6% of those under age 18 and 2.0% of those age 65 or over. At the 2020 American Community Survey, its median household income increased to $104,239 with a mean of $122,814.

Education

Public schools
The city of Corinth is split between Lake Dallas Independent School District (ISD) and Denton Independent School District.

Central/eastern Corinth is in Lake Dallas ISD, with different portions zoned to Corinth Elementary and Shady Shores Elementary. Students in all of Lake Dallas ISD then move up to Lake Dallas Middle and Lake Dallas High.

West and north Corinth are zoned for Denton ISD. West Corinth follows the Hawk Elementary School/Crownover Middle School/Guyer High School feeder (a small section of streets around State School Rd feed into Nelson Elementary instead of Hawk Elementary). North Corinth follows the Stephens Elementary-Myers Middle-Billy Ryan High School feeder pattern.

Colleges and universities
Corinth is home to one of two branch campuses of North Central Texas College in Denton County (the other being in Flower Mound).

The majority of Denton County, Corinth included, is in the boundary of North Central Texas College.

Notable people
Dusty Dvoracek, 2001, former Chicago Bears nose tackle
Josh Jackson, 2015, cornerback for the Green Bay Packers

References

External links
 City of Corinth official website
 The Lake Cities Sun, newspaper

Dallas–Fort Worth metroplex
Cities in Texas
Cities in Denton County, Texas